Henri Lebègue (27 February 1856 – 19 October 1938) was a French palaeographer, director of studies at the École pratique des hautes études.

The French historian Ernest Lebègue (1862–1943), was his brother. Henri Lebègue was also the father of literary historian Raymond Lebègue and nephew of publisher and media owner Alphonse-Nicolas Lebègue (1814–1885) from Brussels.

Palaeographer and professor at the École pratique des hautes études 
An officer of Public Instruction, attached to the library of the University of Paris (Sorbonne) from November 1882 to October 1888, Henri Lebègue wa admitted to the École pratique des hautes études in November 1891 as head of palaeographic studies. He joined the section of historical and philological sciences.

A  researcher, Lebègue was also a translator and published texts by Greek authors related to the geography and history of Gaules. Henri Lebègue also wrote Greek exercise books. He listed and partly translated the Greek alchemical manuscripts kept in Paris (the Parisini).

His latest work was a new translation of the Treaty On the Sublime by Longinus, which was published after his death in 1939.

Henri Lebègue was made a chevalier of the Legion d'honneur in January 1923.

Selected works 
1878–1883: Extrait des auteurs grecs concernant la géographie et l'histoire des Gaules, with Edmond Cougny (trad.), Librairie Renouard,
1917: Glanures paléographiques, Imprimerie nationale
1924: Henri Lebègue, Catalogue des manuscrits alchimiques grecs : les Parisini, Lamertin
1939: Longinus (author) and Henri Lebègue (trans.), Du sublime, Les Belles Lettres, "Collection des universités de France. Série grecque"

See also
 Longinus (literature)
 Palaeography
 École pratique des hautes études

External links 
 Henri Lebègue on data.bnf.fr
  Du Sublime. Texte établi et traduit par Henri Lebègue on Persée

French palaeographers
Academic staff of the École pratique des hautes études
Chevaliers of the Légion d'honneur
People from Nogent-sur-Marne
1856 births
1938 deaths